Rick Harnish is executive director of the Midwest High Speed Rail Association (MHSRA), which he helped found in 1993.

Career
Harnish's quotes and opinion pieces frequently appear in national,  Midwest and Illinois media, and he regularly speaks around the country on high-speed rail issues and railroad infrastructure.

References

High-speed rail in the United States
Living people
Year of birth missing (living people)